The discography of Redfoo, an American rapper, singer and songwriter, consists of two studio albums, eleven singles, five promotional singles, eight music videos and other album appearances. He formed the duo with his nephew Sky Blu in 2006 and they released two studio albums, before going on an indefinite hiatus in 2012. He is the youngest son of Motown Record Corporation founder Berry Gordy, Jr.

Albums

Studio albums

Singles

As lead artist

As featured artist

Promotional singles

Other charted songs

Other appearances

Production and songwriter discography

References

Pop music discographies
Discographies of American artists